The 1971 Idaho Vandals football team represented the University of Idaho in the 1971 NCAA University Division football season. The Vandals, led by second-year head coach Don Robbins, were members of the Big Sky Conference and played the final three of their five home games at the new Idaho Stadium, an outdoor facility on campus in Moscow, Idaho.

The Vandals won their first outright conference title in 1971, which included an eight-game winning streak after opening with two losses. At the time, it was the best record in

Notable games
A third consecutive season opened without a home field, as the new Idaho Stadium was not quite finished and there was no suitable venue available on the Palouse. After the wooden Neale Stadium (1937) was condemned in August 1969, the Vandals played their limited schedule of Palouse home games at the wooden Rogers Field at WSU in nearby Pullman in 1969 and 1970.

The Vandals' season opener was a stunning 14–42 upset loss at Boise State in the first meeting between the two teams, creating an instant  This was actually an Idaho "home game" moved south  because the new stadium in Moscow was behind schedule and  Boise State had been a junior college program through 1967, moved up to NAIA in 1968 as an independent, and joined the NCAA "college division" (Division II) and Big Sky   played a home game every season in Boise in the old wooden Bronco Stadium through 1968; this ended when Boise State joined 

After four consecutive road victories, the Vandals finished the 1971 season at home with a 40–2 victory over Montana State to wrap up the Big Sky title, and a disappointing  non-conference loss to Utah State in the finale. Boise State finished  with a postseason win, but its two losses were in league play and finished second in the Big Sky

Division I
Although a charter member of a conference whose other members were "college division" (Division II) for football, Idaho maintained its status as a "university division" (Division I) program with the NCAA by playing only "university division" opponents in its non-conference  That is why runner-up Boise State went to the Camellia Bowl in 1971, and when the Division II playoffs arrived in 1973, the Vandals were again ineligible, as they were in Division I. (Idaho was a member of the conference primarily for basketball, in Division I.)

The Big Sky moved up to the new Division I-AA in 1978, and Idaho was forced to move down. In 18 seasons in I-AA, the Vandals reached the post-season playoffs 11 times, missing only once in the final 11 seasons 

Idaho returned to Division I-A in 1996 with a move to the Big West, and then to the WAC in 2005. (The Big West dropped football after 2000; Idaho was a "football only" member of the Sun Belt for four seasons,  The WAC dropped football after the 2012 season and Idaho athletics rejoined the Big Sky in 2013 for all sports except football, which was independent in 2013, rejoined the Sun Belt in 2014, and the Big Sky (FCS)

Schedule

Roster

All-conference
Six Vandals were named to the all-Big Sky team, two on offense and four on defense: halfback Fred Riley, guard Andy Kupp, defensive end Rick Simmons, noseguard Steve Barker, and linebackers Ron Linehan and Rand Marquess. The second team also had six Idaho players, with four on offense and two on defense: fullback Frank Doctor, wide receiver Jack Goddard, tackle Larry Bosma, center Ken Muhlbeier, defensive tackle Bill Cady, and defensive back 

Linehan's selection was his third consecutive, and he was also named the team's most valuable player. Three weeks after the season ended, he received a gunshot wound to his left side; he spent less than two days at Gritman hospital and was released. His younger brothers were also starters for the Vandals: Rick was the strong safety in the late 1970s and Scott was the quarterback in the mid-1980s.

NFL Draft
Three Vandal seniors were selected in the 1972 NFL Draft, which lasted seventeen rounds (442 selections).

One junior was selected in the following year's draft in 1973, also seventeen rounds (442 selections).

Two sophomores were selected in the 1974 NFL Draft, which lasted seventeen rounds (442 selections).

List of Idaho Vandals in the NFL Draft

References

External links
Gem of the Mountains: 1972 University of Idaho yearbook – Idaho State at Idaho – October 9, 1971
Montana State and Utah State home games
Go Mighty Vandals – 1971 – The Wild Bunch
Idaho Argonaut – student newspaper – 1971 editions

Idaho
Idaho Vandals football seasons
Big Sky Conference football champion seasons
Idaho Vandals football